Zeke Moore (born December 2, 1943) is a former professional American Football player who played defensive back for the American Football League's Houston Oilers from 1967–1969, and for the NFL Oilers from 1970 through 1977. Moore returned 14 kicks for 405 yards as a rookie. Before his professional career, Moore played for Lincoln University of Missouri. He was a Houston Texans Ambassador for five years.

Moore is currently the president of the Townwood Homeowners Association in Houston, and he is a Texas Registered Peace Officer.

References

1943 births
Living people
Sportspeople from Tuskegee, Alabama
American football cornerbacks
Houston Oilers players
American Football League All-Star players
American Conference Pro Bowl players
Lincoln Blue Tigers football players